June Andrews, is a Scottish nurse who is an expert in dementia studies and aged care. She was the professor of dementia studies at the Dementia Services Development Centre at the University of Stirling. She is now Professor Emeritus.  She has written many publications on the topics of dementia, care homes and geriatric care.

Biography
Andrews attended Ardrossan Academy and undertook an honours degree in philosophy and English literature at the University of Glasgow. In 2020, she completed her LLB at the University of Edinburgh.   She began her nursing career at Mapperly Hospital and the Queens Medical Centre, Nottingham and qualified as a psychiatric and general nurse while studying for a post-graduate degree in American studies. Her clinical nursing posts in the NHS in England were in care of older people, and she became a regular contributor to nursing journals and conferences on ethical issues related to later life.  She was the Scottish Board Secretary of the Royal College of Nursing, 1992–1999.  In 1999 she was appointed as director of nursing in Forth Valley NHS.  She was a civil servant, serving as director of the Centre for Change and Innovation (CCI) in the Scottish Government 2002-2007.  The purpose of the CCI was to foster improvement in delivery of health care, including cancer, diabetes, depression, and operational issues such as waiting times.

In 2010 in Philadelphia, Andrews was presented with the Founders Award of the British American Project, of which she is a Fellow and member of the advisory board. The British American Project is a leadership network celebrating and encouraging this transatlantic relationship.

In 2011, the RCN and Nursing Standard awarded her the Robert Tiffany International prize for promoting evidence-based improvement in dementia care around the world.

She was awarded a Lifetime Achievement Award from the four Chief Nurses of the UK at the Nursing Times Awards in 2012, and was recognised by the Health Service Journal as being one of the top 100 influential clinical leaders in England and the top 50 inspirational women in the UK in 2013.

She was awarded Fellowship of the Royal College of Nursing in 2014, an award given to UK registered nurses who have made an exceptional contribution to the advancement of nursing and health care as a profession.

Andrews was a co-author of Trusted to Care, an independent report on the care of frail older people in general hospitals in Wales, which gave rise to an immediate review of the care of elderly patients at all Welsh hospitals
 
Andrews is the co-author of Ten Helpful Hints for Carers of People with Dementia, which has sold 65,000 copies, and the book, The One-Stop Guide to Dementia; Practical Advice for Families, Professionals, and People Living with Dementia and Alzheimer's Disease, published by Profile Books in February 2015 and has been followed by editions in North America (When Someone You Know Has Dementia) and an international edition (Dementia What You Need To Know) published 2016. She has since written a book about choosing a care home for families (Care Homes: When, Why and How to choose a Care Home). Additionally, Dementia, the One-Stop Guide has been published in a second edition.

Andrews was appointed Officer of the Order of the British Empire (OBE) in the 2016 Birthday Honours for services to people with dementia.

In March 2020, Andrews faced online criticism for asking a Scottish Parliament public audit committee if a UK coronavirus pandemic could be "quite useful" in killing off hospital bed blockers to ease pressure on the NHS. The criticism in the media did not reflect the true nature of the statement, which was a question to the government about overcapacity of UK hospitals with older people who did not need to be there.

References

External links

Living people
Academics of the University of Stirling
Alumni of the University of Glasgow
Scottish nurses
Officers of the Order of the British Empire
Year of birth missing (living people)
People educated at Ardrossan Academy
Fellows of the Royal College of Nursing
British nurses